The Witch in the Cherry Tree is a children's book written by the New Zealand author Margaret Mahy.

References

New Zealand children's books
Books by Margaret Mahy
1974 children's books